KREO (93.5 FM) is an American radio station licensed to serve the community of James Town, Wyoming.

History
The station signed on as KTEA on September 24, 2012.  In November 2012, the station changed its call letters to KMGQ.  The call letters KREO were assigned to the station in January 2014. In July 2016, the owners of two local competing radio stations filed a letter with the Federal Communications Commission regarding the station, noting it would occasionally broadcast a silent carrier, or another licensed broadcast station out of Evanston, Wyoming, some 100 miles to the west. Both filed that the station made on air claims that it would create a translator network and increase its power, however the FCC noted that there were no applications for such changes. It was also claimed that the station was rebroadcasting an internet radio station out of a private residence in Rock Springs, Wyoming, and had no main studio.
In addressing the main studio concern, the station informed the FCC that it was broadcasting from a studio in Rock Springs.
The station remained silent until August 2016, when it flipped to a country format. The FCC dismissed the claims made by the competing stations in December 2016.

Signal
KREO can be heard throughout Sweetwater County. The station's broadcast tower is located on top of Wilkins Peak between Rock Springs and Green River.

References

External links

REO (FM)
Radio stations established in 2015
Sweetwater County, Wyoming
2015 establishments in Wyoming
Country radio stations in the United States